Miroslav Šustek (born 1947) is a Slovak horror and ghost story writer. Despite his forty years of prolific writing, his debut short story collection, Nie ste vy náhodou ten chýrny pán Rafin? (Are You By Any Chance The Famous Mr Rafin?) was only first published in 2007.

Biography
Miroslav Šustek was born on January 4, 1947, in Žilina, Slovakia. He has spent the majority of his life in his hometown. Having become partially disabled at a young age, Šustek devoted his life to writing, his stories initially heavily influenced by classics of the macabre, horror and ghost story genres, later adding elements of humour and parody to the mix.

Writing career
Despite having written more than a thousand short stories in more than forty years of continuous writing, none of them were published until 2000, when Šustek met the future publishers of the Hlboký hrob online horror magazine. Two of his stories published in Hlboký hrob were later included in the Neželané dedičstvo po neobľúbenom strýkovi (An Unwanted Inheritance Left By An Unpopular Uncle) anthology in 2006. Šustek's debut short story collection was subsequently published in 2007.

Works
 Nie ste vy náhodou ten slávny pán Rafin? (2007)

References

External links
 Miroslav Šustek biography at his co-publisher's website (in Slovak)
 An article on Šustek from the Host literary magazine (in Czech)
 Partial bibliography at legie.info (in Czech)

Slovak writers
Slovak horror writers
1947 births
Living people